"Pure Water" is a song by American producer Mustard and American hip hop trio Migos, released as a single on January 16, 2019. It reached the top 40 on the Billboard Hot 100 and the top 20 of the Canadian Hot 100. It was ranked 20th on Billboards Best Songs of 2019 list and Complex named it the 33rd best song of the year.

Critical reception
Stereogum said that the beat has "the crisp, snapping West Coast minimalism that made Mustard the producer of the moment half a decade ago" and called the squealing melodic loop reminiscent of "prime crunk-era Lil Jon".

Charts

Weekly charts

Year-end charts

Certifications

References

2019 songs
2019 singles
Mustard (record producer) songs
Migos songs
Song recordings produced by Mustard (record producer)
Songs written by Mustard (record producer)
Songs written by Offset (rapper)
Songs written by Takeoff (rapper)
Songs written by Quavo